Aryaman is one of the early Vedic Hindu deities. His name signifies "Life-Partner", "close friend", "Partner", "play-fellow" or "companion". He is the third son of Kashyapa and Aditi, the father and mother of the adityas, and is depicted as the mid-morning sun disc. He is the deity of customs, and rules over the customs that rule the various Vedic tribes and peoples.

In the Rigveda, Aryaman is described as the protector of mares and stallions, and the Milky Way (aryamṇáḥ pánthāḥ) is said to be his path.
Aryaman is commonly invoked together with Varuna-Mitra, Bhaga, Bṛhaspati, and other adityas and asuras. 

According to Griffith, the Rigveda also suggests that Aryaman is a supreme deity alongside Mitra and Varuna. According to the Rigveda, Indra, who is traditionally considered the most important deity in the Rigveda, is asked to obtain boons and gifts from Aryaman. Hindu marriage oaths are administered with an invocation to Aryaman being the witness to the event. Aryaman also is the deity of the customs of hospitality.

See also
Airyaman
Amshuman (deity)
Ayyappa
List of solar deities

References 

Adityas
Hindu gods
Rigvedic deities
Solar gods